The Double Room Mystery is a 1917 American silent thriller film directed by Hobart Henley and starring Gertrude Selby, Hayward Mack and Ed Brady.

Cast
 Gertrude Selby as Suzanne - a Slavey 
 Hayward Mack as Speed Cannon 
 Ed Brady as Bill Greely 
 Edward Hearn as Silver Joe 
 Ernest Shields as James 
 Mattie Witting as Mrs. Wiggins 
 Harry Mann as Dago Low

References

Bibliography
 Robert B. Connelly. The Silents: Silent Feature Films, 1910-36, Volume 40, Issue 2. December Press, 1998.

External links
 

1917 films
1910s thriller films
1910s English-language films
American silent feature films
American thriller films
American black-and-white films
Films directed by Hobart Henley
Universal Pictures films
Silent thriller films
1910s American films